Thomas Geary may refer to:

 Thomas J. Geary (1854–1929), U.S. Representative from California
 Thomas Augustine Geary (1775–1801), Irish composer, pianist and organist
 Clive Geary (Thomas Francis Clive Geary, 1922–2004), New Zealand cricketer